Mohamed Salah Marmouri (September 18, 1967) is a retired amateur boxer from Tunisia. He represented his native North African country twice at the Summer Olympics: in 1996 and 2000. He won a bronze medal at the 2001 Mediterranean Games in Tunis, Tunisia and a gold medal at the 1995 All-Africa Games in Harare, Zimbabwe.
Gold médial au jeux medetarrannée Bari 1997.

References
Mohamed salah Marmouri Profile

1967 births
Living people
Light-middleweight boxers
Boxers at the 1996 Summer Olympics
Boxers at the 2000 Summer Olympics
Olympic boxers of Tunisia
Tunisian male boxers
African Games gold medalists for Tunisia
African Games medalists in boxing
Mediterranean Games bronze medalists for Tunisia
Competitors at the 2001 Mediterranean Games
Mediterranean Games medalists in boxing
Competitors at the 1995 All-Africa Games
21st-century Tunisian people

https://www.facebook.com/marmouri.mohamedsalah